General Sir Mowbray Thomson  (April 1, 1832 – February 25, 1917) was an officer in the British East India Company.

Thomson was born in "Bhurtpore" (modern day Bharatpur, Rajasthan), India on April 1, 1832. He was educated in England and attended Addiscombe Military Seminary as a cadet. In 1853 he received a commission in the 53rd Bengal Native Infantry, a regiment in the British East India Company. During the Indian Mutiny of 1857, Thomson played a key role in the defense of Wheeler's Entrenchment during the Siege of Cawnpore. He was one of the few survivors of the siege and subsequent massacre at Sati Chaura Ghat .

Thomson was invalided to England, heavily wounded, and promoted to brevet-major. While convalescing in England, he wrote The Story of Cawnpore, a first-hand account of the siege, which was published in 1859. After returning to India, he was given a civilian post as political agent at Manipur, and later appointed Governor-General's agent for Wajid Ali Shah, the former King of Oudh. He retired in 1885, with the Army rank of major-general, and was promoted to full general in 1894.

Thomson died in Reading, England on February 25, 1917. The funeral service was held on February 28 in Saint Bartholomew's church, Reading and his body cremated at Golders Green Crematorium in London.

References

Sources
Obituary: p. 162, The Annual Register: a review of public events at home and abroad, for the year 1917. London: Longmans, Green and Co. 1918.

1832 births
1917 deaths
British East India Company Army officers
British military personnel of the Indian Rebellion of 1857
British Indian Army generals
Knights Commander of the Order of the Indian Empire